Be Beautiful But Shut Up is a French black-and-white crime comedy film made in 1958, directed by Marc Allégret.

The film features Alain Delon and Jean Paul Belmondo in early roles as members of a gang.

It was also known as Blonde for Danger.

Plot
The protagonist, played by Mylène Demongeot, is a teenage female orphan who after escaping from her detention center joins a gang of Parisian burglars, but then by coincidence meets a young police inspector (played by Henri Vidal) with whom she falls in love, marries and starts a decent life.

The story shows how her former acquaintances from the criminal milieu become suspects in a jewel robbery.

Cast 
 Mylène Demongeot as Virginie Dumayet  
 Henri Vidal as  Insp. Jean Morel  
 Darry Cowl  as Insp. Jérôme 
 Béatrice Altariba as  Olga Babitcheff 
 Roger Hanin  as  Charlemagne 
 Jean-Paul Belmondo  as  Pierrot 
 Alain Delon  as  Loulou 
 Robert Dalban  as Insp. Gotterat  
 François Darbon  as Gino  
 Gabrielle Fontan  as Grand-mère de Jean 
 René Lefèvre  as  Raphaël

Production
Filming took place from December 1957 to February 1958.

Reception
The film recorded admissions of 1,904,380 in France. This made it the 44th most popular film of the year.

References

External links

Be Beautiful But Shut Up at BFI
Film page at Le Film Guide 

French crime comedy films
Films directed by Marc Allégret
1958 films
1950s French films